WPKQ (103.7 MHz) is a commercial FM radio station licensed to North Conway, New Hampshire.  It is owned by Townsquare Media and it simulcasts the alternative rock radio format of its sister station 94.3 WCYY.  It is an affiliate of the New England Patriots Radio Network.  In morning drive time, it carries the sports show Toucher and Rich from WBZ-FM Boston.  WPKQ's main studios are at One City Center in Portland, Maine.

WPKQ has an effective radiated power (ERP) of 22,500 watts.  Its transmitter is atop Mount Washington, New Hampshire, the tallest peak in the Northeast, alongside sister station WHOM 94.9 FM.  It primarily serves northern New Hampshire and western Maine, but its city-grade signal can also be heard in parts of Vermont and Quebec.

History
The 103.7 frequency now occupied by WPKQ began in March 1952 as WMOU-FM, the FM sister station to WMOU (1230 AM) in Berlin.  The stations became WKCB and WKCQ in 1957, but returned to their original callsigns two years later.  WMOU-FM separated from the simulcast of WMOU in 1972 and became WXLQ-FM, airing a rock and oldies format.  This evolved to a mix of top 40 and oldies in 1975.  The station reverted to the WMOU simulcast in 1977 (but retained the WXLQ call letters).
A construction permit for a new 103.7, using WXLQ's former transmitter, was granted on August 8, 1983, to New England Broadcasting, Inc. (formed by Steve Powell, the son of previous WMOU owner Bob Powell) and revived the WMOU call letters (without the "-FM" suffix), with a license to cover issued on March 15, 1984. 

The station moved its transmitter to Mount Washington in 1990, and changed its format to hot adult contemporary as WZPK, "103.7 Peak-FM". Branding themselves as "The Peak of New England" with a Class C flamethrower signal that reached from Boston to Montreal, the station debuted by asking on-air to its audience what they wanted on air by airing the message "We are building YOUR Superstation. Please tell us what you would like to hear", and supplied a 1-800 number for listeners to contact the station.

In 1996, 103.7 adopted its present callsign and a country music format, simulcast from WOKQ in Dover, upon its sale to Fuller-Jeffrey Broadcasting in 1996.  The city of license was changed to North Conway in 1999.

On July 6, 2015, WPKQ split from its simulcast with WOKQ and rebranded as "103.7 The Peak". In doing so, it moved its studios from WOKQ's facility in Dover to Townsquare's existing studio in Portland, alongside WBLM, WCYY, WJBQ and fellow Mount Washington broadcaster WHOM. By 2021, the station's programming was again largely originated from WOKQ, though it retained localized commercial breaks and the “Peak” branding.

On October 22, 2021, at noon, WPKQ dropped its country format and began stunting towards a new format to launch on Monday, October 25. That day, the station began simulcasting a relaunched version of the alternative rock format from WCYY; owing to WPKQ's Mount Washington's transmitter, the change resulted in WCYY's programming becoming available in much of northern New England. WCYY's expansion, which also included WJZN in Augusta, Maine, coincided with the syndication launch of Toucher and Rich from WBZ-FM in Boston, with the WCYY stations, along with Bangor sister station WEZQ, serving as the program's first affiliates.

Signal
Due to its transmitter location on the top of Mount Washington, the station has one of the largest coverage areas in North America, reaching most of New Hampshire (except where WKNE comes in better), the Northeast Kingdom and other portions of Central and Northern Vermont (including Montpelier, Saint Johnsbury and Burlington), Western, Central and Southern Maine (including the Lewiston/Auburn, Augusta and Portland areas), Southern Quebec (including eastern exurbs of Montreal and the Sherbrooke/Estrie area), and small portions of northeast Massachusetts (the northernmost areas of Essex County).

References

External links

Townsquare Media radio stations
PKQ
Carroll County, New Hampshire
Radio stations established in 1952
Radio stations established in 1983
Mount Washington (New Hampshire)
Alternative rock radio stations in the United States